Cameron's Crossing railway station was a station on the Okaihau Branch in New Zealand.

The station opened on 1 May 1914 and closed on 28 January 1974.

References

Defunct railway stations in New Zealand
Rail transport in the Northland Region
Buildings and structures in the Northland Region
Railway stations opened in 1914
Railway stations closed in 1974